"One Day Left to Live" is a song recorded by American country music artist Sammy Kershaw.  It was released in October 1998 as the fourth single from the album Labor of Love.  The song reached #35 on the Billboard Hot Country Singles & Tracks chart.  The song was written by Dean Dillon, Randy Boudreaux and John Northrup.

Chart performance

References

1998 singles
1997 songs
Sammy Kershaw songs
Songs written by Randy Boudreaux
Songs written by Dean Dillon
Song recordings produced by Keith Stegall
Mercury Records singles